Astrid Elisabet Blomberg (born 2 December 1937) is a Swedish curler.

Teams

References

External links
 

Living people
1937 births
Swedish female curlers
Swedish curling champions